10 Boötis is a suspected astrometric binary star system in the northern constellation of Boötes, located around 528 light years away from the Sun. It is visible to the naked eye under suitable viewing conditions as a dim, white-hued star with an apparent visual magnitude of 5.76. Its magnitude is diminished by an extinction of 0.17 due to interstellar dust. This system is moving away from the Earth with a heliocentric radial velocity of +6 km/s.

The visible component is an ordinary A-type main-sequence star with a stellar classification of A0 Vs, where the 's' notation indicates "sharp" absorption lines. It is 337 million years old with a moderate rotation rate, showing a projected rotational velocity of 75 km/s. The star has 2.87 times the mass of the Sun and about 2.7 times the Sun's radius. It is radiating 113 times the Sun's luminosity from its photosphere at an effective temperature of 9,441 K.

References

A-type main-sequence stars
Boötes
BD+22 2650
Bootis, 10
121996
068276
5255